George Bunbury (24 November 1847 – 27 May 1820) was an Irish politician.

Bunbury was educated at Trinity College, Dublin. 

Bunbury was MP for the Irish constituency of Thomastown from 1786 until 1790; and Gowran from 1797 to 1800.

References

Alumni of Trinity College Dublin
People from Cashel, County Tipperary
Irish MPs 1783–1790
Members of the Parliament of Ireland (pre-1801) for County Kilkenny constituencies